The 1956 St. Louis Cardinals season was the team's 75th season in St. Louis, Missouri and its 65th season in the National League. The Cardinals went 76–78 during the season and finished 4th in the National League.

Offseason 
 October 20, 1955: Harry Walker was released by the Cardinals.
 November 27, 1955: Ed Mayer was drafted by the Cardinals from the Boston Red Sox in the 1955 minor league draft.
 November 27, 1955: Billy Muffett was drafted by the Cardinals from the Chicago Cubs in the 1955 rule 5 draft.
 January 31, 1956: Brooks Lawrence and Sonny Senerchia were traded by the Cardinals to the Cincinnati Redlegs for Jackie Collum.
 March 30, 1956: Pete Whisenant was traded by the Cardinals to the Chicago Cubs for Hank Sauer.

Regular season

Season standings

Record vs. opponents

Notable transactions 
 May 14, 1956: Solly Hemus was traded by the Cardinals to the Philadelphia Phillies for Bobby Morgan.
 May 17, 1956: Bill Virdon was traded by the Cardinals to the Pittsburgh Pirates for Dick Littlefield and Bobby Del Greco.
 May 28, 1956: The Cardinals traded cash and a player to be named later to the Pittsburgh Pirates for Toby Atwell. The Cardinals completed the deal by sending Dick Rand to the Pirates on October 14.
 June 14, 1956: Red Schoendienst, Jackie Brandt, Dick Littlefield, Bill Sarni, and a player to be named later were traded by the Cardinals to the New York Giants for Alvin Dark, Ray Katt, Don Liddle, and Whitey Lockman. The Cardinals completed the deal by sending Gordon Jones to the Giants on October 1.

Roster

Player stats

Batting

Starters by position 
Note: Pos = Position; G = Games played; AB = At bats; H = Hits; Avg. = Batting average; HR = Home runs; RBI = Runs batted in

Other batters 
Note: G = Games played; AB = At bats; H = Hits; Avg. = Batting average; HR = Home runs; RBI = Runs batted in

Pitching

Starting pitchers 
Note: G = Games pitched; IP = Innings pitched; W = Wins; L = Losses; ERA = Earned run average; SO = Strikeouts

Other pitchers 
Note: G = Games pitched; IP = Innings pitched; W = Wins; L = Losses; ERA = Earned run average; SO = Strikeouts

Relief pitchers 
Note: G = Games pitched; W = Wins; L = Losses; SV = Saves; ERA = Earned run average; SO = Strikeouts

Farm system 

LEAGUE CHAMPIONS: Rochester, Houston, Fresno

References

External links 
1956 St. Louis Cardinals at Baseball Reference
1956 St. Louis Cardinals team page at www.baseball-almanac.com

St. Louis Cardinals seasons
Saint Louis Cardinals season
1956 in sports in Missouri